The 2000–01 season was the 120th season in the existence of FC Girondins de Bordeaux and the club's 7th consecutive season in the top flight of French football. In addition to the domestic league, Bordeaux participated in this season's edition of the Coupe de France.

Competitions

Overall record

French Division 1

League table

Results summary

Results by round

Matches

Coupe de France

References

FC Girondins de Bordeaux seasons
Bordeaux